{{Automatic_taxobox
| image = 
| image_caption = 
| taxon = Aplomya
| authority = Robineau-Desvoidy, 1830
| type_species = Aplomya zonata (= Tachina confinis (Fallén, 1820))
| type_species_authority = Robineau-Desvoidy, 1830
| display_parents= 2
| synonyms = *Haplomyia Agassiz, 1846Aplomyia Agassiz, 1846Leiosia Wulp, 1893Prozenillia Villeneuve, 1916Wiedemanniomyia Townsend, 1933Aplomyiella Mesnil, 1939Atricholyga Villeneuve, 1939
}}Aplomya  is a genus of flies in the family Tachinidae.

SpeciesAplomya confinis (Fallén, 1820)Aplomya conglomerata (Walker, 1859)Aplomya curvipes (Wulp, 1893)Aplomya distans (Villeneuve, 1916)Aplomya distincta (Baranov, 1931)Aplomya flavisquama (Wulp, 1893)Aplomya latimana Villeneuve, 1934Aplomya lycaena (Curran, 1927)Aplomya metallica (Wiedemann, 1824)Aplomya poultoni (Villeneuve, 1922)Aplomya sellersi (Thompson, 1966)Aplomya seyrigi Mesnil, 1954Aplomya theclarum (Scudder, 1887)Aplomya versicolor'' (Curran, 1927)

References

Tachinidae genera
Exoristinae
Taxa named by Jean-Baptiste Robineau-Desvoidy
Diptera of Africa
Diptera of Asia
Diptera of Europe
Diptera of North America